The Bronk-Silvester House is a historic house located at 188 Mansion Street in Coxsackie, Greene County, New York.

Description and history 
It was built in 1811 and is a two-story, two-by-five-bay brick dwelling with a stone foundation and gabled-roof. It features a center hall plan interior and is in the Federal style.

It was listed on the National Register of Historic Places on March 12, 2002.

References

Houses on the National Register of Historic Places in New York (state)
Federal architecture in New York (state)
Houses completed in 1811
Houses in Greene County, New York
National Register of Historic Places in Greene County, New York